Tommy Quickly (born Thomas Quigley, 7 July 1945, in Norris Green, Liverpool, Lancashire, England) is an English rock and roll singer who recorded mostly in the early 1960s. He was a later signing of artist manager Brian Epstein, whose biggest act was the Beatles. He was born to Patrick Quigley and Dorothy Gower. He is the twin brother of Patricia Quigley.

Professional career 
Spotted as the vocalist with local group the Challengers, Epstein liked Quigley but not the band, suggesting first a name change (to "Tommy Quickly and the Stops"), then pairing him instead with the Remo Four. The next change was in song selection; while Quickly's voice was best suited to rhythm and blues, Epstein steered him toward pop songs, starting with his first single, "Tip of My Tongue", written by John Lennon and Paul McCartney of the Beatles. He then made the usual round of appearances on stage and in public, and was promoted by Epstein as part of his NEMS Enterprises artist stable.

"Tip of My Tongue" was a flop, as were his next four singles. His fifth single, "Wild Side of Life", made the Top 40 of the UK Singles Chart, spending eight weeks there. Quickly was offered the Lennon–McCartney song "No Reply", but when he failed to issue it, the Beatles took it back and recorded it themselves. Described as young, naive and impulsive, and seemingly overwhelmed with matters since parting with the Challengers, Quickly was ill-prepared for the spotlight. When follow-up hits did not materialise, and with manager Epstein unable to push him further, Quickly retired from the music industry in 1965, and for a short time hosted a British variety show for under-twelves, The Five O'Clock Club, his last appearance on the show and in any sort of spotlight being in January 1966. Later that year he spent tıme in Walton Hospital, Liverpool, suffering from a breakdown.

Tommy Quickly and the Remo Four can be seen performing "Humpty Dumpty" in the 1965 film Pop Gear (billed in the United States as Go Go Mania).

Singles
"Tip of My Tongue" (Lennon–McCartney) / "Heaven Only Knows" (August 1963,  Piccadilly 7N 35137)
"Kiss Me Now” / "No Other Love" (1963, Piccadilly 7N 35151)
"Prove It" (Gerry Marsden) / "Haven't You Noticed" (1964, Piccadilly 7N 35167)
"You Might as Well Forget Him" / "It's as Simple as That" (1964, Piccadilly 7N 35183)
"The Wild Side of Life" / "Forget the Other Guy" (October 1964, Pye 7N 15708) UK No. 33
"Humpty Dumpty" / "I'll Go Crazy" (December 1964, Pye 7N 15748)

In popular culture 
Tommy Quickly is portrayed by British actor Andrew Gower in the 2020 independent short film, Humpty Fu*king Dumpty, which depicts Quckly's mental breakdown after his career failed. The film was written and directed by Stephen Walters, and released on 8 May 2020 on their official website HumptyFilm.com.

References

External links
Tommy Quickly: A Manager Recalls

Tommy Quickly Oxford Reference

1945 births
Living people
English male singers
Musicians from Liverpool
People from Norris Green